Bni Oukil Oulad M'Hand (Tarifit: Bni Ukil Wlad Mḥand, ⴱⵏⵉ ⵓⴽⵉⵍ ⵡⵍⴰⴷ ⵎⵃⴰⵏⴷ; Arabic: بني وكيل أولاد امحند) is a commune in the Nador Province of the Oriental administrative region of Morocco. At the time of the 2004 census, the commune had a total population of 10496 people living in 1804 households.

References

Populated places in Nador Province
Rural communes of Oriental (Morocco)